Temple Israel located in Charlotte, North Carolina is a large, urban Conservative synagogue located in the Shalom Park district of South Charlotte.  As one of six synagogues in Charlotte, it serves more than 650 member families. The rabbi since July 2020 is Michael Wolk, who took over from interim Rabbi Howard Seigel. Seigel succeeding the long serving rabbi of 24 years, Murray Ezring. The cantor since 2018 has been soprano Shira T Lissek, previously of Park Avenue Synagogue, New York.

History

With the great wave of immigration of Jews from Eastern Europe occurring in the late 19th century, new settlers came to Charlotte. This group also was deeply religious and brought with them their own customs and attitudes. In September 1895, these new citizens organized the first formal Jewish congregation of the city of Charlotte. This congregation was the forerunner of what is now Temple Israel. They called themselves Agudath Achim, Hebrew United Brotherhood. The group was headed by Harris Miller, Benjamin Silverstein, and Mr. C. Lubin.

By 1915, now "Temple Israel" had constructed its first building and the number of families grew to more than 100.  Two minyans existed at the Temple, one Orthodox and one Conservative.  Eventually, the younger members persuaded the congregation to adopt a stance of worship leading more toward "Conservatism."  This gave way to mixed seating and more use of English in the service.

In 1948 Temple Israel, together with Temple Beth-El, erected a monument to Judah P. Benjamin, "Attorney General, Secretary of War, and Secretary of State of the Confederate government... as a Gift to the North Carolina Division, United Daughters of the Confederacy".

By 1949, Temple Israel had outgrown its building on Seventh Street and relocated to the Dilworth neighborhood of South Charlotte.  By 1955, Temple Israel boasted the largest membership of any Jewish congregation in the Carolinas with more than 350 member families.  In 1985, the synagogue adopted an egalitarian policy for worship, granting women full rights at services to read from the Torah, lead song, and lead prayer.

In 1991, Temple Israel broke ground in Shalom Park of South Charlotte and began construction on its current building. Year 1992 marked the completion of the congregation's third new building, and in 1994 Rabbi Emeritus, Rabbi Murray Ezring became Temple Israel's 19th Senior Rabbi. Current Rabbi Michael Wolk joined temple Israel July 1, 2020 as its 20th Senior Rabbi

In 2013, the congregation voted to withdraw its membership from the United Synagogue of Conservative Judaism, making it one of the largest congregations in the Southeastern United States to leave the umbrella organization, however, as of 2018, the congregation is once again a member of the denomination.

Affiliates

In serving the greater Charlotte metropolitan area, Congregation Emanuel (Statesville, North Carolina) is affiliated with Temple Israel.  This congregation is without full-time clergy, so Temple Israel provides rabbinic leadership, monetary support, and resources to help support this congregation.

Notable Clergy

Cantor Frank Birnbaum served the congregation from 1973 until his retirement in 1986.  Known for his famous song-writing and vocal ability, the Annual Cantor's Concert is named in his honor.

References

External links
 Temple Israel Website
 Congregation Emanuel, Statesville, NC (Congregational Affiliate)

Ashkenazi Jewish culture in the United States
Charlotte metropolitan area
Synagogues in North Carolina
Unaffiliated synagogues in the United States
Buildings and structures in Charlotte, North Carolina
Culture of Charlotte, North Carolina